(25 November 1930 – 17 September 1997) was a Norwegian lawyer and politician from the Conservative Party. He was the 31st prime minister of Norway from 1989 to 1990. He also served as the minister of Industry from 1983 to 1985. Syse was the president of the Lagting 1993–1997. Syse was the president of the Nordic Council in 1988 and 1993. He served in the Norwegian parliament for over 25 years until his sudden death from a cerebral hemorrhage in 1997.

Early life and career 
Syse was born in Nøtterøy in the county of Vestfold. He was the son of Peter Syse (1888–1965) and Magnhild Bjønnes (1898–1985). His father was a local politician and dental surgeon.
He earned his examen artium in 1949 and his degree in law in 1957. He was politically active as a student, serving as chair of Den Konservative Studenterforening, Det Norske Studentersamfund, and the construction committee for Chateau Neuf.

His initial professional experience was as an attorney and manager for the deep sea shipping company Wilh. Wilhelmsen. He worked for Wilhelmsen at various times throughout his career, and was also employed as the editor for Wilhelmsen's newsletter, Skib-rederi.

Jan P. Syse  met Else Walstad (1936–2021) while they both were students at the University of Oslo in 1955, and they were married in 1959. They had the two sons philosopher Henrik Syse and diplomat Christian Syse.

Political career
After being a member of the national council for the Conservative Party since 1957, he started his elected political career in 1963 when he was elected to the Oslo city council, where he served two terms.

He was elected into the Storting as a deputy representative in 1965. He started his term as a full voting member in 1969 to replace Kåre Willoch who was a member of  Borten's Cabinet. Syse served on the Judiciary, Administration, Finance, extended Foreign Affairs and Constitution, and Constitutional committees throughout his parliamentary career. He was also sent as a parliamentary delegate to the United Nations General Assembly, Nordic Council, Inter-Parliamentary Union, and other international bodies. Syse was State Secretary to the Ministry of Justice from 1 November 1970 to 17 March 1971 in the non-Socialist coalition government led by Per Borten. He was Minister of Industry in the second cabinet Willoch from 16 September 1983 to 4 October 1985, and prime minister with the Syse Cabinet from 16 October 1989 to 3 November 1990.

Political legacy
Syse was well liked and respected among political allies and adversaries alike. He worked for cooperation within the Nordic region and also to strengthen the cooperation with the Baltic states, although he opposed their wish to join the Nordic council. His sons Christian Syse and Henrik Syse published Ta ikke den ironiske tonen - tanker og taler av Jan P. Syse (Oslo, Forlaget Press, 2003), a book that describes Syse's speeches and style.

References

Other sources
Borgen, Per Otto (1999)  Norges statsministre (Oslo: Aschehoug)

External links
 
 Interview with Else Syse, in Vi over 60
 Obituary issued by Høyre

 

1930 births
1997 deaths
Norwegian state secretaries
Members of the Storting
Government ministers of Norway
Prime Ministers of Norway
Politicians from Oslo
University of Oslo alumni
Leaders of the Conservative Party (Norway)
20th-century Norwegian politicians
People from Nøtterøy
Ministers of Trade and Shipping of Norway